Anton Andersen (7 September 1880 – 13 October 1971) was a Danish sports shooter. He competed in four events at the 1920 Summer Olympics.

References

External links
 

1880 births
1971 deaths
Danish male sport shooters
Olympic shooters of Denmark
Shooters at the 1920 Summer Olympics
People from Holstebro
Sportspeople from the Central Denmark Region
20th-century Danish people